Charles Wesley Turnbull (February 5, 1935 – July 3, 2022) was a Virgin Islander politician, educator and historian who served as the sixth elected Governor of the United States Virgin Islands from 1999 to 2007.

Biography
Charles Wesley Turnbull was born on February 6, 1935, in the island of St. Thomas to John Wesley Turnbull and Ruth Ann Eliza Skelton of Tortola. Prior to being elected governor in 1998, he was a professor at the University of the Virgin Islands, Commissioner and Assistant Commissioner of the territorial Department of Education, principal and assistant principal of Charlotte Amalie High School, and a teacher in elementary and secondary schools. He was a graduate of Hampton University, earning bachelor's and master's degrees. He earned a doctoral degree in Educational Administration from the University of Minnesota in 1976.

During his tenure as governor, Turnbull served as a member of the National Governors Association, the Southern Governors' Association, and the Democratic Governors Association.

Turnbull was prohibited from seeking re-election in 2006 due to term limits. His term of office expired on January 1, 2007, and he was succeeded by John de Jongh. Turnbull served as a member of the Virgin Islands Fifth Constitutional Convention.

Turnbull died in Washington, D.C., on July 3, 2022, at the age of 87.

References

|-

1935 births
2022 deaths
20th-century African-American people
21st-century African-American people
African-American politicians
American people of British Virgin Islands descent
Democratic Party governors of the United States Virgin Islands
Democratic Party of the Virgin Islands politicians
Governors of the United States Virgin Islands
Hampton University alumni
People from Saint Thomas, U.S. Virgin Islands
United States Virgin Islands educators
United States Virgin Islands Methodists
University of Minnesota College of Education and Human Development alumni
University of the Virgin Islands faculty